Salt Lake National Forest was established as the Salt Lake Forest Reserve by the General Land Office in Utah on May 26, 1904  with .  In 1905 all federal forests were transferred to the U.S. Forest Service. On July 1, 1908 Salt Lake was combined with Wasatch National Forest and the name was discontinued. The lands are presently included in Uinta-Wasatch-Cache National Forest.

References

External links
Forest History Society
Forest History Society:Listing of the National Forests of the United States Text from Davis, Richard C., ed. Encyclopedia of American Forest and Conservation History. New York: Macmillan Publishing Company for the Forest History Society, 1983. Vol. II, pp. 743-788.

Former National Forests of Utah